Chile Route 12, known locally as Ruta 12, is a national route that is located in the Norte Grande of Chile, in the region of Arica y Parinacota. In its course of 3.8 km, it is completely paved and connects Route 5 and Arica with the Chacalluta International Airport, the northernmost airport in the country.

References

Roads in Chile
Transport in Arica y Parinacota Region